Noen Maprang is the southernmost district (amphoe) of Phitsanulok province, central Thailand.

History
To better cope with the problems caused by communist insurgents in northern Thailand in the 1970s, the government separated Tambon Noen Maprang from Wang Thong district to create a minor district (king amphoe) on 6 September 1976. It was upgraded to a full district on 1 April 1983.

Geography
Neighboring districts are (from the north clockwise) Wang Thong of Phitsanulok Province, Khao Kho, Mueang Phetchabun, and Wang Pong of Phetchabun province, Thap Khlo, Wang Sai Phun, and Sak Lek of Phichit province.  

Noen Maprang lies within the Nan Basin, which is part of the Chao Phraya Watershed. Within the district is the source of the Chomphu River. The Ban Mung (Thai: คลองบ้านมุง) and Sai Yoi (คลองไทรย้อย) Rivers also flow through the district.

Administration
The district is divided into seven sub-districts, which are further subdivided into 75 villages (mubans). Noen Maprang is a township (thesaban tambon) covering parts of tambon Noen Maprang. There are a further seven tambon administrative organizations (TAO).

References

External links
amphoe.com (Thai)

Noen Maprang